Columbia Power Corporation is a Crown Corporation, owned by the province of British Columbia, Canada. Its mandate is to undertake hydro-electricity projects in the Columbia River region of British Columbia. 
In so doing, it is required to work with its sister crown corporation the Columbia Basin Trust.

Its assets include:

 Brilliant Dam 145 MW purchased from Teck Cominco in 1996
 Brilliant Expansion 120 MW
 Arrow Lakes Generating Station 185 MW 
 Partnered with FortisBC at Waneta Expansion 335 MW

References

External links
 Columbia Power Corporation - Official Site
 Partnering in Power Development
 

Electric power companies of Canada
Crown corporations of British Columbia
Interior of British Columbia
Hydroelectric power companies of Canada